Palmetto is a 1998 neo-noir thriller film directed by Volker Schlöndorff (as Volker Schlondorff) with a screenplay by E. Max Frye. It is based on the 1961 novel Just Another Sucker by James Hadley Chase. The film stars Woody Harrelson, Elisabeth Shue and Gina Gershon.

Plot
Harry Barber is serving time in prison after being framed in a corruption scandal.

Before his arrest, he was a reporter for a Florida newspaper that uncovered widespread corruption in the local government.  After rejecting a bribe that would have ensured his silence, Harry finds the funds deposited into his bank account and he is promptly arrested.  Now, two years later, he is released when an ex-cop's testimony vindicates him.

Though he is bitter against the town officials, Harry wanders back to Palmetto with his girlfriend Nina, who has been patiently waiting for him.  Unable to find a job, he spends his days lounging in a local bar. In walks Rhea Malroux, the very attractive femme, wife of the richest man in town, who offers him a job: help her and her daughter Odette scam the old man out of $500,000 with a bogus kidnapping scheme, in which Harry would receive a ten percent cut.

Tempted by both Rhea's seductive charms and the prospect of some quick cash, Harry goes along with the plan. First, he goes over to the Malroux mansion to check that his facts are in order, about who Rhea actually is. Then he agrees to meet with Rhea in private to iron out the details. And lastly, he asks to take a meeting with Odette, to make sure she is actually in on the plan. After all of these things seem to check out, Harry agrees.

When Odette goes missing, (the plan is that she will stay out of town for a few days, until her father pays the money,) the story gets leaked to the police. The police then come to Harry, looking to offer him a job. His brother in law is a top detective, and knowing that Harry used to write for the paper, he believes Harry would be good at keeping the press informed, but also keeping them off the backs of the detectives who are working the case. So now Harry is part of the kidnapping, but he's also part of the police investigative team.

When Harry shows up to his bungalow to find Odette dead one day, he realizes he's in a lot of trouble. He uses a tape recording he made, when ironing out the terms of the deal with Rhea Malroux to blackmail her. And so she sends her boyfriend to dispose of Odette's body. But then the real Odette turns up in Harry's bungalow, also dead, and things get even worse. This time, the police find out about it.

That leads to Harry working with the police to catch Rhea Malroux and her boyfriend. Harry goes to see Rhea's husband and tell him everything. He learns that the woman pretending to be Rhea is not this man's actual wife. Instead, she is the gardener. She and her boyfriend, Donnelly take Harry from the Malroux home to a garage, where they are also holding Nina. They plan to kill both of them by dipping them in a barrel of acid, but Harry is wearing a wire and the police arrive. Donnelly falls into the barrel of acid and the woman pretending to be Rhea Malroux is arrested.

Cast
Woody Harrelson as Harry Barber
Elisabeth Shue as Mrs. Donnelly/Rhea Malroux
Gina Gershon as Nina
Rolf Hoppe as Felix Malroux
Michael Rapaport as Donnelly
Chloë Sevigny as Odette
Tom Wright as John Renick
Marc Macaulay as Miles Meadows
Joe Hickey as Lawyer
Ralph Wilcox as Judge
Peter Paul DeLeo as Bartender
Richard Booker as Billy Holden

Reception
The film holds a 37% rating on review site Rotten Tomatoes, based on 35 reviews.

References

External links

 Palmetto film review at the Los Angeles Times

1998 films
1998 crime thriller films
1990s mystery thriller films
American crime thriller films
American mystery thriller films
American neo-noir films
English-language German films
Films based on crime novels
Films based on works by James Hadley Chase
Films set in Florida
Films directed by Volker Schlöndorff
Films scored by Klaus Doldinger
Castle Rock Entertainment films
Columbia Pictures films
German crime thriller films
German mystery thriller films
German neo-noir films
1990s English-language films
1990s American films
1990s German films